The Convent of the Salesas Reales is an 18th-century architectural complex in central Madrid, Spain. Formerly a convent, specifically the convent of the Visitación de Nuestra Señora (Visitation of Our Lady), it was constructed and occupied by the Order of the Visitation of Holy Mary, which had been founded by St. Francis de Sales and St Jeanne de Chantal. The convent's church (dedicated to St Barbara) is now a parish church, and the remainder of the complex houses the Supreme Court of Spain.

History 
The convent was founded in 1748 by Queen Barbara of Portugal, the wife of King Ferdinand VI as a school and home for young noble women. She not only sought to establish a convent, but also a convenient place where she could retire. The convent was designed by François Carlier, construction being started in 1743; the original plans were modified and completed by 1750 by Francisco Moradillo. In 1870, the nuns were evicted, and the building converted in the Palace of Justice. During the twentieth century, the palace-convent suffered two fires, and required restoration by Joaquín Roji. The stairwell at the entrance was completed in 1930, opening to the new Barbara de Braganza street. The Tribunal de Orden Público had its headquarters in the Convent from 1963 till 1977.

The present building has a muted exterior compared to the original 18th century design, which while adhering to Neoclassic love of balanced and rigorous design, also was overflowing with decorative elements such as pilasters and lintels on every floor. In addition, unlike many convents, this building was full of windows. The convent commissioned by the Queen was derided in its time with the lines: 
Bárbara Reina; bárbara obra; bárbaro gusto; bárbaro gasto.
which translates to:
Barbara Queen, barbarous work; barbarous taste; barbarous waste (expense).

Church

The church contains the funeral monuments for Ferdinand VI and his wife Bárbara de Braganza (Barbara of Portugal).  The church and the convent are separately listed as bienes de interés cultural.

References

External links 
 Website of the Supreme Court
 Website of the Parish of Santa Bárbara

Salesas Reales
Bien de Interés Cultural landmarks in Madrid
Convents in Spain
National supreme court buildings